Black Knight was a British research sounding rocket, originally developed to test and verify the design of a re-entry vehicle for the Blue Streak missile. It was the United Kingdom's first indigenous space launcher.

Design work on what would become the Black Knight launch vehicle commenced in 1955, being performed by the Royal Aircraft Establishment (RAE) and British manufacturer Saunders-Roe. Saunders-Roe was the principal manufacturer for the Black Knight at its facility on the Isle of Wight. On 7 September 1958, the first Black Knight was launched at Woomera in Australia. Between 1958 and 1965, a total of 22 launch vehicles were fired, none of which suffered any major failures. After 22 launches, the Black Knight programme was closed.

The success of the Black Knight as a cheap and successful test vehicle led to many studies being performed into further derivatives of the vehicle, including its adaption to serve as an intermediate-range ballistic missile (IRBM) and as a launch vehicle, including one proposal, which was based on the Blue Streak missile and the Black Knight, known as the Black Prince. Technology and experience gained on the Black Knight programme would contribute to the subsequent Black Arrow expendable launch vehicle programme.

Development

Origins
During the early 1950s, the UK government had identified the need to develop its own series of ballistic missiles due to advances being made in this field, particularly by the Soviet Union and the United States. The ballistic missile was of critical importance to developing a more effective method of nuclear deterrence, replacing the role currently occupied by free-fall nuclear bombs and thus a reliance on ever more complex, costly and capable aircraft. A British programme to develop such a missile, named Blue Streak, was promptly initiated; however, there were key questions over the then relatively unknown scenario of what such a vehicle would encounter when attempting re-entry to the atmosphere, there were fears that such a vehicle might simply burn up like a meteor and therefore be unachievable.

To explore the phenomenon of atmospheric entry, it was decided that a dedicated research programme would be necessary in order to acquire research information that would shape the design of subsequent ballistic vehicles. Britain had never previously developed a ballistic missile before, the field being relatively new and with few participants, thus there was significant value in developing and constructing a research ballistic missile in order to gain experience and data on how to design and build such vehicles, develop launch techniques, and general handling. Thus, in 1955, the Black Knight research vehicle was developed for this purpose.

In 1955, due to its close relationship with the Royal Aircraft Establishment (RAE), the British government awarded a contract to British manufacturer Saunders-Roe to produce the Black Knight. This contract involved a complete package for the design, development, manufacturing and testing of the vehicle as well as its flight control system, instrumentation, and supporting infrastructure for its operation.

According to author C.N. Hill, the Black Knight programme supplied the UK and US with a great deal of useful information on re-entry vehicles, necessary for the development of ballistic missiles and for studies into missile defense. Specifically, it influenced the development of the British-built Blue Streak missile programme, while generally benefitting scientific understanding in both the United Kingdom and the United States.

Further development and derivatives
The Black Knight was regarded as being a successful programme, having produced a relatively low cost and reliable rocket. While the Blue Streak missile had by this point been recognised as being too costly to serve as a competitive launcher in the face of international competition, the Black Knight was viewed as having the potential to be more cost-effective in this regard. The Royal Aircraft Establishment (RAE) had been encouraged by its performance and was keen to reuse the rocket elsewhere.

One of the more radical ideas for reusing the Black Knight was voiced by Armstrong-Siddeley, who suggested that the rocket be repurposed as the foundations for an intermediate-range ballistic missile (IRBM). This proposal would have involved greatly increasing the size of the vehicle itself, and the adoption of a substantially more powerful rocket engine in place of the Gamma engine.

The RAE performed a multitude of studies on the subject of prospective derivatives of the Black Knight and its Gamma engine. Many of these focused on the possibility of extending the vehicle to operate a launcher for small satellites and proposed the use of a liquid hydrogen-fuelled upper stage, which was comparatively expensive to develop while not providing much payload capacity without redesigning the Black Knight vehicle itself as well. An alternative solution for satellite launches was explored by the RAE, in which solid fuel boosters would have been attached to the Black Knight. This proposal would have involved a basically unmodified Black Knight vehicle being paired with two strap-on boosters along with two further stages in order to be capable of placing a  payload into a -high orbit. While this implementation was found to be simple and low-cost to develop, the payload capacity remained low.
 
This envisioned more powerful Black Knight rocket was to have been used as part of a further set of planned experiments, which had been codenamed 'Crusade'. Upon review, HM Treasury refused to provide any funding for further Black Knight projects, and work on an enlarged Black Knight was abandoned in favour of the larger Black Arrow satellite launcher.

Design

The Black Knight was a single stage sounding rocket with a separate nose section that on some flights contained a second stage rocket firing downwards for higher speed re-entry studies.

It was powered by Bristol Siddeley Gamma rocket engines, designed and manufactured by Armstrong-Siddeley at their factory in Ansty, near Coventry. 
Between 1956 and 1959, the Gamma rocket engines underwent testing at the High Down Rocket Test Site under the direction of Paul Leyton. The engine ran on kerosene fuel and high-test peroxide (HTP) oxidiser; Saunders-Roe possessed prior experience of working with this mixture as a result of the firm's work on the Saunders-Roe SR.53 rocket propelled interceptor aircraft.

Firings
During 1957, the first test run of the Black Knight rocket was performed at High Down on the Isle of Wight. In September 1958, the second test launch was performed, this being the first to use the dedicated launch facility at the Woomera Test Range, Australia; the majority of Black Knight launches were performed from Woomera, leading to the launchers being constructed in the UK and then transported to Australia.

The first two launch vehicles were used as 'proving rounds': launches which lacked separating re-entry heads, in order to test and validate the design of the rocket itself. The first launch ended in an unexpected high altitude explosion after 90% of the fuel had been consumed, which investigation showed to be caused by a fault in the self destruct electrics. The third launch of the Black Knight was the first to carry an actual payload in the form of a re-entry vehicle, which was present for the purpose of testing the properties of the re-entry body's chosen design. All the re-entry firings deliberately took place on clear moonless nights, so that the luminous wake of the re-entry body could be observed photographically.

Further firings with different heads showed up some unusual phenomena, and further tests under the code names Gaslight and Dazzle were carried out in conjunction with the United States. A variety of heads were flown in these tests, including a plain copper sphere and a silica sphere. Heads composed of a composite asbestos-based material known as Durestos were also flown, and later tests finalised on a cone-shaped head re-entering pointed-end first, as used on many subsequent missile RVs.

A total of 25 Black Knight launch vehicles were constructed at a cost of just over £40,000 each. A single rocket (BK02) was used for ground testing. One (BK11) was expended as part of the European Launcher Development Organisation (ELDO) initiative as an investigation of range facilities. The majority, 21, were fired as part of re-entry experiments; if they had been used as launch vehicles for satellites, all bar seven would have successfully attained orbit. The remaining two rockets (BK02 and BK22) were preserved and are now kept on static display in museums in Edinburgh and Liverpool.

All launches of the Black Knight were successful and there were no major failures. Authors Robin Paine and Roger Syms summarised this achievement as: "Altogether, 22 successful launches were made without a single failure - a remarkable record without parallel in ballistics rocket development.

Survivors

The Black Knight BK02 rocket is on display at the Royal Museum Connect Gallery in Edinburgh. It is nearly 11 m high and stretches up for three floors.
The Black Knight BK22 rocket is on display at the World Museum in Liverpool. It is suspended from the ceiling near the Planetarium, there are other Black Knight components on display nearby.

See also
 Rainbow Codes
 Black Arrow
 Skylark

References

Citations

Bibliography

 Hill, C.N. "A Vertical Empire: The History of the UK Rocket and Space Programme, 1950–1971." World Scientific, 2001. .
 Laycock, Stuart and Philip Laycock. "Unexpected Britain." Amberley Publishing Limited, 2014. .
 Massie, Harri and M. O. Robins. "History of British Space Science." Cambridge University Press, 1986. .
 Paine, Robin and Roger Syms. "On a Cushion of Air." Robin Paine, 2012. .
 Stocker, Jeremy. "Britain and Ballistic Missile Defence, 1942-2002." Routledge, 2004. .
 Twigge, Stephen Robert. "The Early Development of Guided Weapons in the United Kingdom, 1940-1960." Taylor & Francis'', 1993. .

External links

 
 BBC Radio 4 – "The Archive Hour – Britain's Space Race". 11 August 2007.
 a cutaway drawing of the Black Knight

Cold War military equipment of the United Kingdom
1960 in spaceflight
1961 in spaceflight
Collections of the National Museums of Scotland
Expendable space launch systems
Rockets and missiles
Saunders-Roe
Space launch vehicles of the United Kingdom